The 2008 UCLA Bruins baseball team represented the University of California, Los Angeles in the 2008 NCAA Division I baseball season. The Bruins played their home games in Jackie Robinson Stadium. UCLA finished the regular season as the #3 team in the Pacific-10 Conference behind #2 Stanford and #1 Arizona State. The Bruins made it to the 2008 NCAA Division I baseball tournament for the third year in a row, competing in the Fullerton Regionals. After beating Virginia 3–2 in the first round, the Bruins beat the number 1 seeded Cal State Fullerton Titans 11–4. Since the Titans beat Virginia in their double elimination game, the Bruins faced the Titans again in the Regional Finals. The Bruins lost 11–8 and 5–4 to the Titans to finish the season as runners-up in the Fullerton Regionals.

Previous season 
The 2007 season saw the Bruins finish 33–28 and third in the Pac-10 Conference behind #1 Arizona State and #2 Arizona. The 2007 season ended in the Fullerton Super Regionals when the Bruins lost two games in a row to Cal State Fullerton.

Roster

Schedule 

! style="background:#536895;color:#FFB300;"| Regular Season
|- valign="top" 

|- align="center" bgcolor="#ccffcc"
| 1 || February 23 || Oklahoma || Jackie Robinson Stadium || 7–5 || D. Klein (1–0) || R. Duke (0–1) || None || 619 || 1–0 || –
|- align="center" bgcolor="#FFE6E6"
| 2 || February 23 || Oklahoma || Jackie Robinson Stadium || 3–2 12 || D. Klein (1–1) || A. Doyle (1–0) || J. McCarter || 619 || 1–1 ||–
|- align="center" bgcolor=
| – || February 24 || Oklahoma || Jackie Robinson Stadium || Cancelled || – || – || – || – || 1–1 ||–
|- align="center" bgcolor="#ccffcc"
| 3 || February 26 || Cal State Northridge || Matador Field || 22–2 || M. Drummond (1–0) || D. Muren (0–1) || None || 221 || 2–1 || –
|- align="center" bgcolor="#ccffcc"
| 4 || February 27 || UC Santa Barbara || Jackie Robinson Stadium || 5–4 13 || J. Uribe (1–0) || Z. Samuels (0–1) || None || 437 || 3–1 || –
|- align="center" bgcolor="#ccffcc"
| 5 || February 29 || Southern || Jackie Robinson Stadium || 11–2 || C. Brewer (1–0) || C. Donaby (0–1) || None || 534 || 4–1 || –
|-

Rankings

UCLA Bruins in the 2008 MLB Draft 
The following members of the UCLA Bruins baseball program were drafted in the 2008 Major League Baseball Draft.

References 

Ucla Bruins
UCLA Bruins baseball seasons
UCLA
UCLA